Geralt of Rivia is a fictional character and the protagonist of The Witcher Saga of short stories and novels by Polish author Andrzej Sapkowski. He is a magically enhanced monster-hunter known as a "witcher", who possesses supernatural abilities due to his mutations. He was described by Péter Apor as a character embodying "the neo-liberal anti-politics" spirit of Polish popular culture of the 1990s, following his debut in the books.

Geralt of Rivia is also the protagonist in CD Projekt Red's series of video games based on The Witcher. In television adaptations, he was portrayed by Michał Żebrowski in The Hexer film and television series, while Henry Cavill portrays the character in the first three seasons of Netflix's The Witcher television series, with Tristan Ruggeri portraying a young Geralt in the first season, and Liam Hemsworth due to take over the role from the fourth season onward.

Fictional biography

Novels

Geralt is a witcher, a magical mutant made for hunting and killing monsters. Shortly after being born, Geralt's mother, Visenna, gives him away to undergo training and, eventually, become a witcher at Kaer Morhen – the stronghold of the witchers. Geralt survives mutations during the Trial of the Grasses, thanks to which he gains various witcher traits: high resistance to injury, poison, and diseases, as well as slowed aging, but also infertility; all witchers are infertile. He resists the "changes" brought on by the Trial of Grasses better than most. This encourages his makers to perform even more dangerous experimental procedures on him, making him lose all body pigmentation. Because of his pale skin and white hair, he is also known in the Elder Speech as "Gwynbleidd" (close to the Welsh translation "Blaidd Gwyn"), the White Wolf. From the arduous training of Witchers, he becomes a master swordfighter and learns how to use the Signs, simple spells used by the witchers.

Despite his name, Geralt does not come from Rivia (although he learns how to mimic a Rivian accent and is later knighted for services to the queen of Rivia): young witchers are encouraged to make up surnames for themselves by master Vesemir, to make their names sound more trustworthy. He claims that his first choice was Geralt Roger Eric du Haute-Bellegarde, but this was dismissed by Vesemir as silly and pretentious.

After completing his witcher training, he receives his Wolf medallion (the symbol of Kaer Morhen) and embarks into the world on his horse called Płotka (literally, "Roach" ; he gives the same name to every horse he owns) to become a monster slayer for hire.

Even though Geralt does not believe in destiny, he unknowingly demands the unborn child of princess Pavetta and her husband Duny as a reward for his services by invoking "the Law of Surprise". The child turns out to be a girl, Cirilla, commonly known as Ciri; since then the two are linked to each other. At first, Geralt does not take her because women cannot become witchers. However, fate causes Geralt and Ciri to cross their paths thrice, with him claiming her for a second time when he invokes the Law of Surprise on a traveling merchant he saves from monsters during a random encounter; and after the death of her grandmother, Queen Calanthe of Cintra, Geralt ends up taking the girl into his care, training and loving her as his own daughter.

Following the short stories, the novels unfold as Geralt is pulled into a whirlwind of events in his attempts to protect Ciri from those who would do her harm, becoming reluctantly embroiled in the political contentions of monarchs and emperors.

Reception 

Péter Apor described Geralt as being emblematic of Polish popular culture's spirit of "neo-liberal anti-politics" in the 1990s. He is a professional, carrying out his duties and unwilling to become involved in the "petty quarrels" of contemporary politics. Sapkowski has stated that he personally abhors politics and considers his books to be politically neutral. Marek Oramus compared Geralt to Raymond Chandler's signature character Philip Marlowe. Dawid Matuszek discussed the gender and sexuality of Geralt, arguing that while Geralt has many obvious masculine characteristics, a deeper analysis also finds elements of feminine traits in his character.

In 2018, GamesRadar ranked Geralt as the 6th best hero in video game history. In 2018, he was included in Tom's Guide Top 25 Best Video Game Characters of All Time.

In other media

Film and television
Michał Żebrowski portrays Geralt in the 2001 Polish film adaptation, The Hexer. He continued the role in the television series of the same name that followed in 2002. Żebrowski also provides the dub voice of Cavill's Geralt in the Polish-language dub of Netflix's TV adaptation.

Henry Cavill portrays Geralt in the Netflix television series The Witcher, the first season of which was released in December 2019. Sapkowski served as a creative consultant on the project. Starting with season 4, the role will be recast, with Liam Hemsworth portraying Geralt. Tristan Ruggeri appears in flashbacks as a younger Geralt.

The character of Geralt was dubbed by the following voice actors: Michał Żebrowski (Polish), Jiří Dvořák (Czech), Alexander Doering (German), Pepe Vilchis (Latin Spanish), Guillermo Romero (Spanish), Adrien Antoine (French), Pawan Kalra (Hindi), Welker Gábor (Hungarian), Gianfranco Miranda (Italian), Hiroki Tōchi (Japanese), Guilherme Briggs (Brazilian Portuguese), Sergey Ponomarev (Russian), Krin Aksorndee (Thai) and Rıza Karaağaçlı (Turkish).

In The Witcher: Nightmare of the Wolf animated film, young Geralt was voiced by Harry Hissrich.

Video games

Geralt's adventures continue in a non-canonical version by CD Projekt Red's video game trilogy (The Witcher, The Witcher 2: Assassins of Kings and The Witcher 3: Wild Hunt), where he is still alive. He is voiced by Jacek Rozenek in Polish and Doug Cockle in English.

The third installment of the trilogy, like its predecessors, follows Geralt through his final adventures. Following the events of Witcher 2, Geralt has regained his memory of the past and prepares to embark on a new journey. In the Witcher 3, Geralt is on the hunt for the only person he considers kin, Ciri. Along his journey, Geralt must face the Wild Hunt in order to protect the people he cares about. In the new open world, Geralt has the opportunity to complete quests that are both part of the main story and side quests. He will also interact with old friends Dandelion and Vesemir along with potential lovers Triss Merigold and Yennefer.

Sapkowski stated that the games are a work of art of their own and that they cannot be considered either an "alternative version", or a sequel, "because this can only be told by Geralt's creator. A certain Andrzej Sapkowski."

Geralt, voiced by Cockle, appeared as a guest character in the 2018 game Soulcalibur VI. He also appeared in special content for Monster Hunter: World and Daemon X Machina.

Personality

In the game series, and similarly in the Netflix show, Geralt is depicted as strikingly handsome despite numerous scars on his face and body. Both Cockle and Cavill provide Geralt with a gravelly, monotone voice, rarely betraying significant emotion or changing tone.

Though the novel version of the character strives to remain politically neutral, in the video games, players are presented with many key decisions that can influence Geralt’s behavior and how he might be perceived by others. Players can therefore make Geralt more politically assertive or choose to keep him neutral, which can have long-term consequences on how the story unfolds. Players can also choose to make Geralt ruthless, or lean toward making him more compassionate.

Geralt has little patience for things he considers foolish, and will often be dismissive of, or exasperated toward those he feels are imposing upon his time. While silliness on the part of others often sparks his ire, his gruff exterior is sometimes undercut by a mild sense of humor, as he appreciates teutonic puns and the occasional one-liner intentionally delivered for comedic effect.

He also has a softer side to his personality, typically reserved for the women in his life such as Triss, Yenn, and Ciri. He is something of a sucker for women, and is not immune to being manipulated by them.

Geralt hates magical portals and often audibly expresses his displeasure whenever he is forced to make use of them. He explains that his distaste for portals is due to the fact that one never knows where they will end up when they step through a portal.

Commemoration

In 2018, one of the city squares in Sapkowski's hometown of Łódź was named in honour of Geralt of Rivia to celebrate the author's 70th birthday.

In 2019, the Mint of Gdańsk produced a series of collector coins in collaboration with Andrzej Sapkowski. The first coin in the series was based thematically on the short story collection The Last Wish and features Geralt of Rivia. The issue of each subsequent coin corresponds to successive volumes of stories from the Witcher Saga.

In October 2021, a mural of Geralt was painted on the side of a high-rise building in Łódź. Spanning three 70-meter-high walls on a 26-floor apartment block and covering almost 2,000 sq/m, it is the largest mural in Poland and one of the largest in the world. The mural has been inspired by an 1818 painting Wanderer above the Sea of Fog by German Romantic-era artist Caspar David Friedrich.

See also

 List of characters in The Witcher series
 Reynevan

References

The Witcher
Characters in fantasy novel series
Fantasy video game characters
Fantasy film characters
Literary characters introduced in 1986
Television characters introduced in 2019
Fictional characters who use magic
Fictional characters with accelerated healing
Fictional characters with albinism
Fictional characters with superhuman strength
Fictional knights
Fictional mutants
Fictional monster hunters
Fictional swordfighters
Fictional characters with slowed ageing